Amador, from Latin  meaning "lover", is both a surname and a male given name. As a given name it usually refers to Saint Amator. Notable people with the name include:

Surname:
 Agustí Roc Amador (born 1971), Catalan ski-mountaineer and long-distance runner
 Andrey Amador (born 1986), Costa Rican road-bicycle racer
 Carlos Fonseca Amador (1936–1976) professor, politician, and Nicaraguan
 Jose Maria Amador (1777–1883), rancher, miner, and businessman, for whom Amador City and Amador County, California are named
 Juan Valentín Amador (1793–1848), Mexican army general
 Manuel Amador Guerrero (1833–1909), first President of Panama
 Ryan Amador, American singer-songwriter and LGBT rights advocate

Given name:
 King Amador (died 1596), insurgent on São Tomé
 Rafael Amador (born 1967), Mexican football defender
 Santos Amador (born 1982), Bolivian footballer
 Amador Álvarez (born 1945), Spanish politician
 Amador Bendayán (1920–1989), Venezuelan actor and entertainer
 Amador Bueno (c. 1572–between 1646 and 1650?), Spanish settler in Brazil and government official
 Amador Lugo Guadarrama (1921–2002), Mexican painter and engraver
 Amador Salazar (1868–1916), military leader in the Mexican Revolution

See also 
 
 
 Amado (disambiguation)

References 

Spanish masculine given names
Spanish-language surnames